Elections to Liverpool City Council were held on 1 May 2008.  One third of the council was up for election. (30 seats plus 1 in a by-election)

After the election, the composition of the council was

Election result

Ward results

* - Councillor standing for re-election.

Allerton & Hunts Cross

Anfield

Belle Vale

Central

Childwall

Church

Clubmoor

County

Cressington

Croxteth

Everton

Fazakerley

Greenbank

Kensington & Fairfield

Kirkdale

Knotty Ash

Mossley Hill

Norris Green

Old Swan

Picton

Princes Park

Riverside

St Michael's

Speke-Garston

Tuebrook & Stoneycroft

Warbreck

Wavertree

West Derby

Woolton

Yew Tree

By Elections

Fazakerley, 18 February 2010

Caused by the death of Councillor Jack Spriggs (Labour, elected 1 May 2008).

References

2008
2008 English local elections
2000s in Liverpool